Marco Aurélio Martins Ivo, known as Marcos Denner (born March 12, 1976) is a Brazilian footballer who currently plays as a forward for Grêmio Esportivo Brasil.

Club career
His previous club was Nova Iguaçu, Tupi, América, Juventus, Botafogo, FC Seoul, then known as Anyang LG Cheetahs, Portuguesa, Santo André, Flamengo, Fortaleza, Marília, Galo Maringá, Paulista, Sertãozinho, Caxias, Juventude and Guarani.

External links
 
 

1976 births
Living people
Association football forwards
Brazilian footballers
Brazilian expatriate footballers
Nova Iguaçu Futebol Clube players
Tupi Football Club players
América Futebol Clube (SP) players
Clube Atlético Juventus players
Botafogo Futebol Clube (SP) players
FC Seoul players
Associação Portuguesa de Desportos players
Esporte Clube Santo André players
Criciúma Esporte Clube players
CR Flamengo footballers
Fortaleza Esporte Clube players
Marília Atlético Clube players
Paulista Futebol Clube players
Sertãozinho Futebol Clube players
Sociedade Esportiva e Recreativa Caxias do Sul players
Esporte Clube Juventude players
Guarani FC players
Grêmio Esportivo Brasil players
K League 1 players
Expatriate footballers in South Korea
Footballers from Rio de Janeiro (city)
Brazilian expatriate sportspeople in South Korea